Nicolas Abdat (born 29 November 1996) is a German professional footballer who plays as a left-back for Eerste Divisie club TOP Oss.

Career statistics

References

External links

1996 births
Living people
People from the Rhine Province
People from Wipperfürth
Sportspeople from Cologne (region)
German footballers
Footballers from North Rhine-Westphalia
Association football defenders
2. Bundesliga players
Regionalliga players
VfL Bochum II players
VfL Bochum players
VfL Wolfsburg II players
SG Wattenscheid 09 players
Eerste Divisie players
Go Ahead Eagles players
TOP Oss players
German expatriate footballers
German expatriate sportspeople in the Netherlands
Expatriate footballers in the Netherlands